"Yonkers" is a song by American rapper Tyler, the Creator, released digitally as the second single from his debut studio album Goblin on February 14, 2011. It was written and produced by Tyler. It received controversy due to its violent lyrics and numerous disses, although it was critically acclaimed and landed on numerous year-end lists. Tyler also directed a music video for the single, which was also met with positive critical reception and earned him the MTV Video Music Award for Best New Artist at the 2011 MTV Video Music Awards. Numerous magazine publications noted "Yonkers" as Tyler's breakout song.

Background
The song is named after Yonkers, New York. Tyler claimed to have created the beat in eight minutes as a parody of stereotypical 1990s New York hip hop:

Content and controversy
Tyler disses numerous musicians in the song, most notably Hayley Williams, B.o.B, and Bruno Mars. He also dissed Mars in The Game's song "Martians vs. Goblins". In response, B.o.B released a disstrack titled "No Future" in reference to Tyler's rap group Odd Future. Tyler praised the song and claimed that he did not initially think it was a diss track. In response to the line "stab Bruno Mars in his goddamn esophagus", Mars said, "[Tyler] has to wait in line if he wants to stab me... he's definitely not the first guy that's said something like that to me and he's not going to be the last." Rapper Capital Steez sampled the song in his song "Negus", using the same opening line, "I'm a fucking walking paradox."

Music video

The music video for "Yonkers", directed by Tyler, was released via Odd Future's YouTube channel on February 10, 2011. Shot in black-and-white using a perspective control lens, the video features Tyler performing the song on a chair in a blank room while handling and later eating a cockroach, which causes him to vomit. The word "kill" is seen on his hand, along with a St. Peter's cross. The video concludes with Tyler taking off his shirt, realizing that his nose has started bleeding, and hanging himself. The video excludes the third and final verse as the version with this verse was not released until four days after the video. The full song was, however, included on the album.

The music video went viral. On February 23, 2011, rapper Kanye West stated on Twitter that he thought the "Yonkers" video was the best of 2011. The video earned Tyler the Best New Artist award at the 2011 MTV Video Music Awards, as well as a nomination for Video of the Year.

Critical reception
"Yonkers" received critical acclaim. Pitchfork awarding it with the "Best New Music" award, stating that it is "not only the best thing any OF affiliate has produced to date, it's also the perfect distillation of what they do well". The Guardian named it the third best song of 2011. Claire Suddath of Time named "Yonkers" the eighth best song of 2011, describing it as "minimalistic rap" and "a piece of performance art", concluding that it "creates a thrilling sense of uneasiness that the music world hadn't seen since the early days of punk". Pigeons and Planes named the single the 21st best song of 2011. XXL named it the 22nd best song of 2011, noting that the song, video, and Tyler's performance of "Sandwitches" on Late Night with Jimmy Fallon propelled him to stardom. Rolling Stone named the song the 23rd best song of 2011, stating that Tyler "stabs Bruno Mars and disses Jesus [...] somehow, all the bad vibes are mesmerizing".

In the media
The song was featured in the soundtrack to the video game Saints Row: The Third.

Track listing
All songs written and produced by Tyler, the Creator (T. Okonma).

Charts

Weekly charts

Certifications

References

2011 singles
Songs about suicide
Songs critical of religion
Diss tracks
Odd Future
Obscenity controversies in music
Tyler, the Creator songs
XL Recordings singles
Black-and-white music videos
2011 songs
Songs written by Tyler, the Creator
Horrorcore songs
Musical parodies